Namibia has competed in seven Commonwealth Games, making its first appearance in Victoria, and appearing in every subsequent Games to date.

Medals

See also
All-time medal tally of Commonwealth Games
Namibia
Commonwealth Games Federation

References

External links
Commonwealth Games Federation

 
Nations at the Commonwealth Games